Anton Yuryevich Kireyev (born 19 July 1983) is a former Russian professional football player.

Club career
He played in the Russian Football National League for FC Ufa in 2012.

References

External links
 

1983 births
Living people
Russian footballers
Association football midfielders
FC Znamya Truda Orekhovo-Zuyevo players
FC Lukhovitsy players
FC Petrotrest players
FC Ufa players
FC Vityaz Podolsk players